KRVL (94.3 FM) is a radio station licensed to Kerrville, Texas, United States. It broadcasts a mainstream rock format as "Rev FM". The station is currently owned by Justin McClure, Angela Krause, and Michael Krause, through licensee JAM Broadcasting, LLC.

History
The station was assigned the call letters KERV-FM on June 14, 1982. On December 1, 1984, the station changed its call sign to the current KRVL. On June 12, 2007, the station was sold to Foster Charitable Foundation, Inc.

Effective August 2, 2018, Foster Charitable Foundation sold KRVL to JAM Broadcasting, LLC for $250,000.

On-air personalities
Mornings - Cody, Coach, and Leslee
Afternoons - Becka Grey
Sports - Mark Keller
Weather - Cary Burgess
News - Michelle Layton

References

External links

RVL
Mainstream rock radio stations in the United States
Radio stations established in 1982
1982 establishments in Texas